"Mais qui est la belette ?" is a 1998 song recorded by French hip hop act Manau. It was the third single from its album Panique celtique and was released in December 1998. It achieved success, becoming a number-one hit in France and Belgium (Wallonia), although its sales were not as high as the first single of the album, "La Tribu de Dana".

Song information
"Mais qui est la belette ?" ("But who is the weasel?") is an adaptation of a popular song from Brittany named "La Jument de Michao", covered in a rap Celtic version. The refrain is the same as that of the original song, namely the lyrics 'J'entends le loup, le renard et la belette' ('I hear the wolf, the fox and the weasel'), but the verses and the title are changed.

In France, the single debuted at number six on 19 December 1998 and peaked at number one four weeks later. It remained for 12 weeks in the top ten, 19 weeks in the top 50 and 23 weeks on the chart (top 100).

In Belgium (Wallonia), the song charted for 22 weeks in the top 40, ten of them in the top five. It started at number 34 on 26 December 1998, entered the top ten the week after, and topped the chart from the fifth to the eighth week. Thereafter, it did not stop to drop on the chart.

Manau performed the song live on the French TV show Sol en Cirque, aired on France 2, on 24 December 2005.

Track listings
 CD single
 "Mais qui est la belette ?" (remix) — 3:55
 "Le Chien du forgeron" — 4:23

 12" maxi
 "Mais qui est la belette ?" (remix) — 3:55
 "Mais qui est la belette ?" (original version) — 3:58

Charts and sales

Peak positions

End of year charts

Certifications

References

Songs about mammals
1998 singles
Manau (group) songs
Ultratop 50 Singles (Wallonia) number-one singles
SNEP Top Singles number-one singles